Captain John Catterall Leach,  (1 September 1894 – 10 December 1941) was a British naval officer. He was the only captain of the battleship  during its short period in service.

Early life and career 
The son of Charles Rothwell Leach, a solicitor, Leach entered the Royal Naval College, Osborne as a cadet in 1907 and served in the Royal Navy during the First World War.

The Bismarck
Very soon after the Prince of Wales entered active service in 1941, the ship fought under Leach's command in the Battle of the Denmark Strait, and suffered damage fighting the German battleship Bismarck. However, damage inflicted by the Prince of Wales caused the Bismarck to lose fuel, forcing the latter to attempt to return to a base in occupied France.

Despite a proposal to court-martial Leach for breaking off the action with the Bismarck after the Hood had sunk, he was awarded the Distinguished Service Order for his part. In the 1960 film Sink the Bismarck! Leach was played by actor Esmond Knight, who had been on the Prince of Wales''' bridge with Leach during the Battle of the Denmark Strait and was partially blinded when the ship was hit by Bismarck's gunfire.

Force Z 
In late 1941, Prince of Wales formed part of Force Z sent to Singapore. Off the coast of Malaya, she was sunk by the Japanese. Leach died as he went down with his ship.

His son was Admiral of the Fleet Sir Henry Leach (1923–2011), who was First Sea Lord during the Falklands War.

Notes

References

Bibliography

Hein, David. "Vulnerable: HMS Prince of Wales in 1941". Journal of Military History'' 77, no. 3 (July 2013): 955–989. Abstract online: http://www.smh-hq.org/jmh/jmhvols/773.html

Willis, Matthew B. 'In the Highest Traditions of the Royal Navy: The Life of Captain John Leach, MVO, DSO'. The History Press, 2011.

1894 births
1941 deaths
Royal Navy personnel killed in World War II
Companions of the Distinguished Service Order
Members of the Royal Victorian Order
Royal Navy officers
Royal Navy officers of World War I
Royal Navy officers of World War II
Captains who went down with the ship
People educated at the Royal Naval College, Osborne